Chudleigh Abbey was an abbey in Chudleigh, Devon, England.

St Bridget's Abbey of Syon had existed since 1415, returning to Spettisbury in Devon in 1861 after 300 years in Flanders following the dissolution of the monasteries. In 1887 their monastery was built in Chudleigh and they occupied it until 1925 when they moved to Liverpool.

The building was then converted into 6 residences.

References 

Monasteries in Devon
Chudleigh